Alain Goriely  is a Belgian mathematician, currently holding the statutory professorship (chair) of mathematical modelling at the University of Oxford, Mathematical Institute. He is director of the Oxford Centre for Industrial Mathematics (OCIAM), of the International Brain and Mechanics Lab (IBMTL) and Professorial Fellow at St Catherine's College, Oxford. At the Mathematical Institute, he was the director of external relations and public engagement, from 2013 until 2022, initiating the Oxford Mathematics series of public lectures. In 2022, he was elected to the Royal Society.

Education and early life 

Born and raised in Brussels, Alain Goriely obtained his B.Sc. in 1989 and Ph.D. in 1994  from the Université Libre de Bruxelles where he became lecturer in the Mathematics Department. Shortly after, he moved to the University of Arizona to take the positions of Research Associate (1994-1997), Assistant Professor (1998-2002), Associate Professor (2002-2007) and Professor (2007-2010). In Tucson, he also served as acting head for the Program in Applied Mathematics in 2006-2007 and 2007–2008. In 2010, he moved to Oxford to take up the inaugural chair of Mathematical Modelling and to become Director of the Oxford Centre for Collaborative Applied Mathematics (OCCAM). He is a Senior Fellow of the Oxford Martin School and received a M.A. in 2010 from the University of Oxford (by resolution). He has held a number of positions, including visiting professorships at the École Polytechnique Fédérale de Lausanne, the École normale supérieure (Paris), and the Pierre and Marie Curie University. He also held the Timoshenko professorial fellowship at Stanford University and the Distinguished Rothschild Visiting Fellowship at the Isaac Newton Institute.

Research and career
Goriely works in the field of applied mathematics and he is interested in a broad range of problems including dynamical systems; the mechanics of biological growth; the modelling of the brain, the theoretical foundations of mechanics; the dynamics of curves, knots, and rods; the modelling of cancer; the development of new photovoltaic devices; the modelling of lithium-ion batteries and, more generally the study and development of mathematical methods for applied sciences.

Differential equations and dynamical systems
In his doctoral research on singularities, integrability theory, and dynamical systems, he established deep connections between the analytic and geometric approaches of differential equations by showing that the local behavior of the solutions of differential equations in complex time is connected to their global geometric properties in phase space. In particular, he developed new tests to prove the integrability and non-integrability for systems of differential equations and discrete mappings, based on the so-called Painlevé expansions in complex time. More importantly, he derived a new form of the Melnikov distance from the local Painleve property that can be used to prove the existence of transverse homoclinic connections, thereby directly relating local multivaluedness in complex time to chaotic dynamics in real-time. He also gave sufficient conditions for the existence of open sets of initial conditions leading to finite-time singularities which cosmologists use to explore possible singularities in cosmological models (such as the expanding general-relativistic Friedmann  universe, brane singularity). These results are summarized in his monograph.

Curves and filaments
Over the years, Goriely has made important contributions to the modeling and analysis of filaments. Elastic curves can be modeled through the Kirchhoff equations that take into account bending, shearing, and extension. Within this context, in 1998 he identified a new type of instability driven by curvature. He showed that a torsional instability of filaments under tension can result in the formation of structures with opposite chirality for which he coined the word tendril perversion. Other contributions in this area include a complete classification of static solutions, the discovery of new exact dynamical solutions for the Kirchhoff elastic rods, and the development of new geometric methods to prove stability through the positive definiteness of the second variation. With colleagues, he provided a complete classification of uniform equilibria, and built the first three-dimensional theory for the nonlinear dynamics of elastic tubes conveying a fluid, studied the twining of vines, proved the existence of compact waves traveling on nonlinear rods, the inversion of curvature in bacteria, the growth of stems, the mechanics of seed expulsion, the shape and mechanics of proteins, and a full theory of growing and remodeling elastic rods suitable to describe many biological structures. With colleagues, he used this framework to develop a theory of plant tropism that include multiple stimuli.

Morphoelasticity
Goriely  has  worked  in the applications of nonlinear mechanics to the field of biological materials and biological growth. Through his work, he was central in the development of a general mechanical theory of biological growth. This theory, for which he coined the word morphoelasticity,  deals with the physical forces and shapes generated during development, homeostasis, or pathology. At the mathematical level, it is based on the general theory of nonlinear anelasticity. While the basic theoretical framework was understood as early as 1994, in 2005 with Martine Ben Amar, he developed a general stability method for morphoelastic solids and demonstrated that patterns and instabilities can be driven exclusively through growth. He further expanded this aspect of his research to demonstrate the occurrence of growth-induced patterns in many biological and physiological systems such as fungi, bacteria, and microbial cellular blebbing. Together with Derek Moulton and Régis Chirat, he  developed a theory to describe morphological patterns for seashells, such as spikes and commarginal ornamentation. His theory of morphoelasticity is developed in his 2017 monograph on growth.

Mathematical foundations of mechanics
Goriely made several contributions to  the foundations of classical mechanics and  nonlinear elasticity. With his collaborators, he has given a general exact theory of Euler buckling within three-dimensional nonlinear elasticity, developed new fundamental adscititious inequalities for materials exhibiting the negative Poynting effect, and studied the nonlinear dynamics of shear waves in elastic solids. Since 2012, he  initiated,  with Arash  Yavari, a research programme related to the geometric foundations of mechanics for nonlinear solids. In the absence of defects, solids can be described through the mapping of a reference configuration in the Euclidean space to a current configuration that also sits  in Euclidean space. In the presence of defects, the correct underlying mathematical structure that  describes the reference configuration is a non-Euclidean manifold. These ideas, first presented in the work of  Kazuo Kondo in the 1940s, were known by the mechanics community but had never been used directly to build an effective theory of continuous defects. In this fully geometric theory, first described in their 2012 paper, they show that pure dislocations, disclinations, and point  defects are, respectively, associated with Weitzenbock, Riemann, and
Weyl manifolds. Further, they used Cartan's moving frames theory  to formulate a complete theory of defects which can be used to obtain exact solutions for a  number of important problems in nonlinear dislocation theory and anelasticity. They used this theory to obtain  the exact nonlinear analogue of Eshelby's celebrated inclusion problem for a spherical  inclusion in an isotropic incompressible nonlinear solid. They also introduced the concept of discombinations  to describe sources of incompatibility related to multiple origins (point, lines, and edge defects).

Energy and materials
Goriely has done  work in the field of materials science and renewable energy, ionic liquids, nano-particles fabrication, supercapacitors, and lithium-ion batteries. In 2013, he initiated a collaboration with Henry Snaith on the development of a new generation of perovskite solar cell. In their 2014 paper, they developed a mathematical model to predict coverage and morphology during the annealing of  a thin solid film of a perovskite absorber. This model predicts the optimum film thickness  and annealing temperature ensuring that it has exactly the right degree of transparency.

Brain modeling
Since 2012, Goriely has done some work related to the brain modeling. With his collaborators, he has developed models for axon growth  based on the combined mechanics of microtubules extension, growth cone connection,. At the tissue level, with his collaborators, he developed new constitutive models for brain tissue validated on multi-axial shear experiments using human brain tissues. This work forms the basis for his models of  swelling initiation and propagation showing that the Donnan effect is not sufficient and that swelling is also caused by an osmotic pressure increase driven by non-permeating solutes released by necrotic cells. At the organ level, he proposed the first mechanical models of craniectomy  and craniosynostosis  through systematic mathematical modeling, analysis and computational simulations in fully segmented brain geometry and explained the thickness asymmetry between gyri and sulci first noted more than 100 years ago by Brodmann. More recently, they developed a model for dementia propagation and showed that atrophy could be modeled through a multiplicative decomposition of the deformation gradient coupling mass removal to toxic proteins   and studied the related cognitive decay.

Publications

Goriely is the author of three books
Goriely A. Integrability and nonintegrability of dynamical systems. World Scientific; 2001.
Goriely A. The mathematics and mechanics of biological growth. Springer; 2017   
Goriely A. Applied Mathematics: A very short introduction. Oxford University Press; 2017   	

His most cited papers are:
Eperon GE, Burlakov VM, Docampo P, Goriely A, Snaith HJ. Morphological control for high performance, solution‐processed planar heterojunction perovskite solar cells. Advanced Functional Materials. 2014 Jan;24(1):151-7. According to Google Scholar, it has been cited 1922 times.
Saidaminov MI, Abdelhady AL, Murali B, Alarousu E, Burlakov VM, Peng W, Dursun I, Wang L, He Y, Maculan G, Goriely A. High-quality bulk hybrid perovskite single crystals within minutes by inverse temperature crystallization. Nature Communications. 2015 Jul 6;6(1):1-6. According to Google Scholar, this article has been cited 1159  times    
Noel NK, Abate A, Stranks SD, Parrott ES, Burlakov VM, Goriely A, Snaith HJ. Enhanced photoluminescence and solar cell performance via Lewis base passivation of organic–inorganic lead halide perovskites. ACS Nano. 2014 Oct 28;8(10):9815-21. According to Google Scholar, this article has been cited  1131 times    
Stranks SD, Burlakov VM, Leijtens T, Ball JM, Goriely A, Snaith HJ. Recombination kinetics in organic-inorganic perovskites: excitons, free charge, and subgap states. Physical Review Applied. 2014 Sep 11;2(3):034007. According to Google Scholar, this article has been cited 950 times    
Ben Amar M, Goriely A. Growth and instability in elastic tissues. Journal of the Mechanics and Physics of Solids. 2005 Oct 1;53(10):2284-319. According to Google Scholar, this article has been cited 353 times    
Goriely A, Geers MG, Holzapfel GA, Jayamohan J, Jérusalem A, Sivaloganathan S, Squier W, van Dommelen JA, Waters S, Kuhl E. Mechanics of the brain: perspectives, challenges, and opportunities. Biomechanics and Modeling in Mechanobiology. 2015 Oct;14(5):931-65. According to Google Scholar, this article has been cited 271 times    
Cangelosi R, Goriely A. Component retention in principal component analysis with application to cDNA microarray data. Biology Direct. 2007 Dec;2(1):1-21. According to Google Scholar, this article has been cited 255 times

References 

Living people
Fellows of the Royal Society
Fellows of the Society for Industrial and Applied Mathematics
Belgian mathematicians
Year of birth missing (living people)